This is a list of Akhisarspor's managers and their respective honours, from 2000, when the first professional manager was appointed, to the present day.

Managerial history

References

External links
Official Website 
Akhisar Belediyespor at UEFA

 
Akhisarspor